The 1983 Iowa State Cyclones football team represented Iowa State University as a member of the Big Eight Conference during the 1983 NCAA Division I-A football season. Led by first-year head coach Jim Criner, the Cyclones compiled an overall record of 4–7 with a mark of 3–4 in conference play, tying for fourth place in the Big 8. Iowa State played home games at Cyclone Stadium in Ames, Iowa.

Schedule

Roster
QB David Archer

Game summaries

Iowa

at Oklahoma

at Nebraska

References

Iowa State
Iowa State Cyclones football seasons
Iowa State Cyclones football